Deh-e Mahdi (also Romanized as Deh-e Mahdī, Deh-e Mehdī, and Deh Mehdī) is a village in Hendudur Rural District, Sarband District, Shazand County, Markazi Province, Iran. At the 2006 census, its population was 199, in 44 families.

References 

Populated places in Shazand County